Curiosity is a 1967 Yugoslavian cartoon.

Plot
A man is seated on a bench.  He has a paper bag next to him.  Over the course of the cartoon, passersby try to find out what he keeps in the bag.

Awards
1967 Krakow Film Festival
Special Mention: International Competition (Borivoj Dovnikovic-Bordo)

1967 Leipzig DOK Festival
Golden Dove: Borivoj Dovnikovic-Bordo

External links
 

1967 films
Yugoslav animated short films
1967 animated films
Zagreb Film films
Croatian animated short films
Films set in Yugoslavia